Sliced is an American television series that premiered on  on The History Channel. The program was hosted by John McCalmont and Budd Kelley, who "slice" everyday objects in half to uncover how they work. The show aired on Thursdays at 10:00 pm Eastern Time, with three episodes airing on a Saturday afternoon, and the last airing on a Thursday at 8:00 pm Eastern Time.

Episodes

Season 1 (2010)
The first season consisted of 17 episodes.

References

History (American TV channel) original programming
2010 American television series debuts
2010 American television series endings